Sham Lal Choudhary is an Indian politician and member of the Bharatiya Janata Party. He was a cabinet minister in the BJP-PDP Coalition Government in the state of Jammu and Kashmir .

Choudhary rapidly rose in politics. Hailing from the Dev Batala village of Bhimber Tehsil in what is now the Pakistani administered territory of Azad Kashmir, he migrated to the border village of Chakroi in Ranbir Singh Pura. He currently represents the border constituency of   Suchetgarh in the Jammu district, in the Jammu and Kashmir Legislative Assembly.

Education
Choudhary started his primary education in the Chakroi government school and matriculated in 1977 before attending Government Higher Secondary School, R S Pura to complete his 10+2. An outstanding student, Choudhary entered the SPMR College of Commerce in 1981 despite hardships.

Social life
Choudhary has spearheaded various efforts to help the poor. He was responsible for changing the Chakroi Development Committee into the Border Development Committee, giving the people a voice in the area's development.

Political career
In 1996,  Choudhary joined the Bhartiya Janta Party (BJP) to represent the border population, and in 2000 won his debut Panchayat elections unopposed.

BJP chose him as their party candidate from Suchetgarh for the 2008 assembly elections, which he won by a large margin.

In his first tenure as MLA, the border district experienced its greatest recorded development. Choudhary was re-elected in 2014, and was eventually inducted into the cabinet.

Choudhary lost the DDC Elections from Suchetgarh,this was the only seat in Jammu which BJP lost.

References 

People from Jammu district
Bharatiya Janata Party politicians from Jammu and Kashmir
Jammu and Kashmir MLAs 2008–2014
Living people
Jammu and Kashmir MLAs 2014–2018
Year of birth missing (living people)